The 1973 Los Angeles Rams season was the team's 36th year with the National Football League and the 28th season in Los Angeles. The Rams were 7–0 at home for the first time since 1945. On the road, the Rams were 5–2.

The Rams donned new uniforms, which remained in use until 1994, their final season in Los Angeles, and though they moved to St. Louis in 1995, the uniform tradition continued until 1999, where they won Super Bowl XXXIV, and wore them for Super Bowl LIII. Among these changes, the Rams converted from white helmet horns to yellow helmet horns. The uniforms would return for their home games in 2018 and 2019.

The Rams finished the season with a 12–2 record and won the NFC West and appeared in the playoffs for the first time in the post-merger era. However, in their first post-merger playoff game, they lost to the Dallas Cowboys 27–16. This was the first of seven straight division titles for the Rams spanning from 1973 to 1979.

Offseason

NFL Draft

Roster

Regular season

Schedule

Game summaries

Week 6

Newly acquired quarterback John Hadl, the NFC Player of the Year in 1973, and a stingy Los Angeles defense led the 6–0 Rams to a 10–0 lead in the first half on the way to a 24–7 victory over the 2–2–2 Green Bay Packers. After a scoreless first quarter, the Rams took the lead on kicker David Ray's 44-yard field goal. The next score came on a 46-yard touchdown pass from Hadl to former Eagles wide receiver Harold Jackson. Green Bay cut the deficit to 10–7 on wide receiver Barry Smith's 23-yard touchdown catch from MacArthur Lane on a halfback option pass.

Los Angeles gained momentum in the third quarter on a 40-yard field goal by David Ray. A 1-yard touchdown run by running back Larry Smith in the fourth quarter put the Rams ahead 20–7. Later in the game, the Packers found themselves deep in their own territory. Moments later, Dryer came storming in from the right side of the defense and chased down Green Bay quarterback Scott Hunter, dropping him in the end zone for a safety. On the Packers' following possession near their own goal line, Dryer attacked again. He looped through the middle of the Packers' offensive line and dragged backup quarterback Jim Del Gaizo down for his second safety of the game, setting a new NFL record.

For his efforts, Dryer was named the Associated Press NFL Defensive Player of the Week.

Week 12

Playoffs

Standings

References

Los Angeles Rams
Los Angeles Rams seasons
NFC West championship seasons
Los Angeles Rams